Shaheb Chatterjee is a Bengali Indian male actorand singer of Tollywood Bangla and Bengali television. 

Shaheb Chatterjee, also known as Shaheb Chattopadhyay, is a Bengali Indian male actor and singer of Tollywood Bangla and Bengali television. He is an alumnus of Dakshinee, the Rabindrasangeet institution of Kolkata. He is noted for his acting and singing, especially in Tagore songs or Rabindra Sangeet, and various cinemas of Tollywood Bangla. He appears in the Bengali TV serial Goyenda Ginni, which aired on Zee Bangla, as the husband of the protagonist Parama Mitra, Dr. Porimal Mitra, and as singer Sujon Kumar, in the serial Potol Kumar Ganwala, which is broadcast on Star Jalsha. He appeared as the king of Bhawal, O Tar Sannashi Rani, in the Bengali TV show, Sanyashi Raja, also broadcast on Star Jalsha. He participated in the reality show Dadagiri on December 30, 2017.

Filmography

Actor
{{columns-list|colwidth=35em|
Bazi (2005)
Andhakarer Shabdo (2006)
Mon Amour: Shesher Kobita Revisited (2008)
Shri Chaitanya Mahaprabhu (2008)
Hitlist (2009)
Shukno Lanka (2010)
033 (2010)
Hemlock Society (2012)
Goyenda Gogol (2013)
Cornel (2013) 
Bachchan (2014 film)
Gogoler Kirti (2014)
Jogajog (2015)
Love Express (2016)
Black Widows (2020) Web Series - as Rameez Sheikh
Hridpindo (2021)Jodi Ek Din}}

Playback singerGoopy Bagha Phire EloMegh Brishti Khela (2008)Mon Amour: Shesher Kobita Revisited (2008)Avijatrik (2021)

 Television Goyenda Ginni (2015–2016), Zee Bangla (role: Doctor Parimal Mitra - Parama Mitra's husband)Potol Kumar Gaanwala (2015–2017), Star Jalsha (role: Sujon Kumar Mallick - singer and Potol's father)Sanyashi Raja'' (2017–2018), Star Jalsha (role: Rajkumar Ronendro Bardhan Rai and Bimbobti 's husband)

References

External links

Living people

Bengali male actors
Indian male film actors

Syamaprasad College alumni

Bengali male television actors

Singers from Kolkata
21st-century Indian male actors

1978 births
Male actors in Bengali cinema
Male actors from Kolkata
University of Calcutta alumni
Bengali playback singers
Indian male playback singers